Jeeves and the King of Clubs is a 2018 novel by Ben Schott, set in P. G. Wodehouse Jeeves and Wooster universe.

Plot

Production 
Jeeves and the King of Clubs was produced with the permission of Sir Edward Cazalet, the executor of Wodehouse's estate. In October 2017, the publishing rights were purchased by Hutchinson for a six-figure sum.

Reception 
Reception to the novel was generally positive. Alexander Larman described the novel as "an amusing and well written homage". Ian Sansom described the work as a "bravura performance" and a "bang-on Bertie Wooster reboot". The Times Matthew Adams called it "a most thrilling return". The Irish Times Tom Mathews called the work a "pale imitation". Paddy Kehoe for RTÉ gave the work three and a half stars out of five.

Sophie Ratcliffe for The Times Literary Supplement called the work as "Wodehouse for the Brexit era". Tom Williams reviewed the novel for Literary Review.

References

External links 
 Schott reads an extract from Jeeves and the King of Clubs on YouTube

2018 British novels
P. G. Wodehouse
Hutchinson (publisher) books
Little, Brown and Company books